Ruchyi is a rural locality (a selo) and the administrative center of Ruchyevskoye Rural Settlement of Mezensky District, Arkhangelsk Oblast, Russia. The population was 219 as of 2010. There are 4 streets.

Geography 
Ruchyi is located 522 km west of Mezen (the district's administrative centre) by road.

References 

Rural localities in Mezensky District